Cynthia Lo Ka Kay (born July 27, 1982 in Hong Kong Island) is a Hong Kong sport shooter. She has been selected to compete for Hong Kong at the 2004 Summer Olympics, and trains under head coach and eventual 2008 Olympian Wong Fai for the Hong Kong Rifle Association.

Lo qualified as the lone female shooter for the Hong Kong squad in the 10 m air pistol at the 2004 Summer Olympics in Athens. She had been granted an Olympic invitation for her country by ISSF and IOC, having registered a minimum qualifying score of 374 at the ISSF World Cup meet in Changwon, South Korea a year earlier. Lo fired a substandard 371 out of a possible 400 to finish in a distant thirty-fourth from a field of forty-one shooters in the qualifying round, failing to advance further to the final.

References

External links

1982 births
Living people
Hong Kong female sport shooters
Olympic shooters of Hong Kong
Shooters at the 2004 Summer Olympics
Shooters at the 2006 Asian Games
Shooters at the 2018 Asian Games
Asian Games competitors for Hong Kong